Boy is a 2010 New Zealand comedy-drama film, written and directed by Taika Waititi. The film stars James Rolleston, Te Aho Aho Eketone-Whitu, and Waititi. It is produced by Cliff Curtis, Ainsley Gardiner and Emanuel Michael and financed by the New Zealand Film Commission. In New Zealand, the film eclipsed previous records for a first week's box office takings for local production. Boy went on to become the highest-grossing New Zealand film at the local box office. The soundtrack to Boy features New Zealand artists such as The Phoenix Foundation, who previously provided music for Waititi's film Eagle vs Shark.

Plot
In 1984, Alamein, known as Boy, is an 11-year-old living in Waihau Bay, in the Tairawhiti (Gisborne) region of New Zealand, on a small farm with his grandmother, younger brother Rocky, and several cousins. Boy spends his time dreaming of Michael Jackson, hanging out with his friends Dallas and Dynasty, trying to impress Chardonnay, a girl at his school, talking to his pet goat, and making up wild stories about his estranged father, Alamein. Rocky, meanwhile, is a quiet, odd child, who believes he has dangerous superpowers because his mother died giving birth to him. One day, Boy and Rocky's grandmother leaves for a funeral in Wellington, leaving Boy in charge of the house and taking care of the other children. Boy is then surprised to see his father and two other men arrive at the farm.

Boy is overjoyed to see Alamein return, thinking that he has come to take the boys away to live with him, but Rocky is uncertain about their father's sudden reappearance. It seems at first that Alamein has finally come back to be in his sons' lives, but it's soon revealed that he is actually there to find a bag of money that he had buried on the farm before being arrested by the police. With his patched gang, the Crazy Horses (which is just him and two friends), Alamein begins digging up the field, searching for the money. Boy sees this and offers to help, thinking Alamein is digging for treasure, and Alamein soon decides to hang out with Boy and be a father. He cuts his son's hair to look like Michael Jackson, and the two go on drives in Alamein's car and get revenge on Boy's school bullies. Boy brings Alamein marijuana to sell from a crop grown by Dallas and Dynasty's father, a member of a local gang. Alamein, uncomfortable with being called 'Dad,' convinces Boy to call him Shogun instead.

Boy begins to see himself as an adult and a Crazy Horse, growing distant from his friends. However, Alamein, unable to find the money, becomes frustrated and drives off, leaving Boy behind. Boy continues to dig for the money alone until he finally discovers it. Excited, Boy hides the moneybag in his goat's pen, then takes his father's Crazy Horses jacket and proudly treats his friends to ice blocks and lollies. When Alamein drives up, Boy goes to tell him that he has found the money, but Alamein hits Boy for stealing his jacket and angrily questions him about where he found the money for the ice blocks, leaving Boy humiliated. Alamein later apologizes, telling his son for the first time that he loves him, and Boy goes to retrieve the moneybag; only to find that it has been eaten by his goat.

Alamein and Rocky continue to dig for the hidden money, making Boy uneasy. Boy decides to make up for losing the money by leading Alamein to the marijuana crop owned by Dallas and Dynasty's father, and Alamein gathers the entire crop. The group is spotted running away by Dynasty, who stares at Boy, betrayed. Later, Alamein takes his gang out to celebrate. Whilst waiting in the car with Boy, Rocky tells his brother that he likes their father, and wants to get to know him better. Another car then drives up, and the local gang gets out. Boy sees Dynasty sitting in the front seat with a black eye. The gang approaches Alamein and the Crazy Horses, confronting them over stealing their marijuana. At first, Boy imagines his dad successfully fighting off the gang in a Michael Jackson dance sequence, but reality comes back to him, and he sees the gang beat Alamein. While driving home, Alamein accidentally hits and kills Boy's goat.

The next day, Alamein is abandoned by his men, who steal the marijuana and the car. Enraged, Alamein trashes the house. Meanwhile, Boy visits his mother's grave, drinking alcohol and smoking marijuana, and finally comes to terms with the fact that all of his happy, early memories of his father are make-believe, and Alamein was in fact not even there when Rocky was born. Meanwhile, Alamein sits in the barn, depressed that he has been unable to find his money. Rocky comes up to him and attempts to comfort him with his 'powers,' telling Alamein that he is sorry he killed his mother by being born. Just then, Boy comes in and scatters the shredded money at Alamein's feet, then begins hitting his father, screaming to know why he wasn't there when Boy and Rocky's mother died. Boy tells Alamein that they are nothing alike, then returns to the house to take care of his cousins. The next morning, the children clean up the house, their grandmother returns home, and Alamein is gone.

Boy tells Rocky that Alamein has gone to Japan to train as a samurai. He reconnects with his friends and apologizes to Dynasty, then goes with Rocky to visit their mother's grave. The two boys find Alamein sitting there. Quietly, they join him, before Rocky asks, "How was Japan?"

The film ends with a mid-credits sequence of all the major characters dancing in a routine that is a mixture of haka and Michael Jackson's Thriller.

Cast
 James Rolleston as Boy, a Māori kid who is a huge fan of Michael Jackson, Boy dreams of becoming rich and going to the city with his father, brother, and his pet goat. His real name is Alamein, like his father.
 Te Aho Aho Eketone-Whitu as Rocky, Boy's shy younger brother who believes he has superpowers.
 Taika Waititi as Alamein, Boy and Rocky's father; an ex-convict and former national serviceman who wants to be the leader of a biker gang, and comes back to Waihau Bay to find his lost money. 
 Moerangi Tihore as Dynasty, Dallas' sister and one of Boy's best friends. She is the daughter of a biker and seems to have feelings for Boy.
 Cherilee Martin as Kelly, Boy's same-age cousin, who lives with him in the same house, with her three kid sisters.
 RickyLee Waipuka-Russell as Chardonnay, a teenage girl that Boy has a crush on, and who totally ignores him.
 Haze Reweti as Dallas, one of Boy's best friends.
 Maakariini Butler as Murray, one of Boy's friends from school.
 Rajvinder Eria as Tane, Boy's Indian friend, who is always alongside Murray and Dallas.
 Manihera Rangiuaia as Kingi, a school bully who often bullies Boy. He wears a Michael Jackson "Thriller" jacket.
 Darcy Ray Flavell-Hudson as Holden, Kingi's older brother, who also bullies Boy but comes to fear Boy's father Alamein and comes to admire him.
 Rachel House as Aunty Gracey, the sister of Boy's deceased mother, who owns a store in front of the sea.
 Waihoroi Shortland as Weirdo, a strange man who lives near the bridge, and appears to always be looking for something. He seems to be childish and inoffensive.
 Cohen Holloway as Chuppa, a friend of Alamein, who is an ex-convict and very foolish, along with Juju.
 Pana Hema Taylor as Juju, the other of Alamein's friends. Like Chuppa, he is always getting himself in trouble alongside the kids.
 Craig Hall as Mr. Langston, the Pākehā school principal, who studied with Boy's parents.
 Mavis Paenga as Nan, Boy's grandmother and Alamein's mother. She travels to someone's funeral for two weeks, leaving Boy in charge. She calls the children "My Mokos", which is short for mokopuna, the Māori word for grandchildren.

Production

Waititi started developing Boy soon after finishing the short film Two Cars, One Night, and it first emerged as a film called Choice. The project was accepted into the Sundance Writer's Lab in 2005, where Waititi workshopped it with script writers Frank Pierson, Susan Shilliday, David Benioff and Naomi Foner Gyllenhaal. Instead of making Boy his first film as a director, Waititi went on to make oddball romance Eagle vs Shark, and continued to develop the screenplay over the next three years.

Once the script was finally ready, there was a small window of opportunity in which to make it. Waititi dropped the title Choice because he felt it would not translate to international audiences, and the film was retitled The Volcano. "It was a big pain about this kid's potential to be bigger than he is or just blooms or explode," said Waititi. "So it was a character in the script as well. When we were shooting the film it was still called Volcano and during the editing. We ended up cutting a lot of the stuff out."

Waititi wanted to shoot the film in the place where he partly grew up, Waihau Bay. The story was set in summer, but it was challenging to shoot in the height of summer due to the area's popularity as a fishing and holiday destination. The film features fields of maize, which is harvested starting in late April. James Rolleston was not initially cast in the lead role of Boy. Another actor was already in place when Rolleston turned up for a costume fitting as an extra. Waititi gave him an audition and after reviewing the film clips, Rolleston was offered the role two days before shooting began.

Waititi raised $110,000 via the crowdfunding website Kickstarter to distribute the film in the United States. At the time, this was the most prominent example of crowdfunding in New Zealand.

Soundtrack

 Hine e Hine – The Phoenix Foundation
 Poi E – Pātea Māori Club
 Pass the Dutchie – Musical Youth
 One Million Rainbows – The Phoenix Foundation
 French Letter – Herbs
 Dragons & Demons – Herbs
 Forget It – The Phoenix Foundation
 Aku Raukura (Disco Mix) – Pātea Māori Club
 Out on the Street – Alastair Riddell
 Hine e Hine – St Josephs Maori Girls Choir
 Here We Are – The Phoenix Foundation
 Paki-o-Matariki – The Ratana Senior Concert Party
 Mum – Prince Tui Teka
 E Te Atua – St Josephs Maori Girls Choir
 Karu – Prince Tui Teka
 Flock of Hearts – The Phoenix Foundation

Release

Boy premiered at the 2010 Sundance Film Festival on 22 January 2010 and competed in the "World Cinema – Dramatic" category. It was theatrically released on 25 March 2010 in New Zealand, and screened at the Antipodean Film Festival in Saint Tropez, France, in October 2010.

The film was released on DVD and Blu-ray in 2011 by Paramount Home Media Distribution.

Reception

Critical response
Based on 65 reviews collected by Rotten Tomatoes, the film has an overall approval rating from critics of 87%, with an average score of 7.3/10. Its critics consensus reads, "Boy possesses the offbeat charm associated with New Zealand film but is also fully capable of drawing the viewer in emotionally." Peter Calder of The New Zealand Herald gave the film five out of five stars. He praised the performances of the three main actors and said "it's hard to praise too highly the pitch-perfect tone of this movie."

The film critic Clarisse Loughrey has identified it as her favourite film, along with The Apartment.

Box office
On release in New Zealand, the film topped the box office receipts for the week, earning more on its opening day than any previous New Zealand film. The film grossed nearly $900,000 in its first seven days, beating Alice in Wonderland and homegrown pictures Whale Rider and The World's Fastest Indian. It also climbed above international animated-fantasy hit How to Train Your Dragon and mythical action flick Clash of the Titans. Boy become the highest grossing New Zealand film to date in the country, surpassing The World's Fastest Indian which had held the position for five years.

Awards
 AFI Fest Audience Award – Best International Feature Film – Taika Waititi – Won
 Asia Pacific Screen Award – Best Children's Feature Film – Ainsley Gardiner, Cliff Curtis, Emanuel Michael and Merata Mita – Nominated
 Berlin International Film Festival Deutsches Kinderhilfswerk Grand Prix – Best Feature Film – Taika Waititi – Won
 Melbourne International Film Festival Most Popular Feature Film – Taika Waititi – Won
 Sundance Film Festival Grand Jury Prize – World Cinema – Dramatic – Taika Waititi – Nominated
 Sydney Film Festival Audience Award – Best Feature Film – Taika Waititi – Won
 New Zealand Film and TV Awards – 13 nominations, seven wins including Best Feature Film, Best Director, and Best Screenplay

Notes
1.  International television and home media distribution is handled by Kino Lorber.

References

External links
 
 
 

2010 films
2010s coming-of-age comedy-drama films
2010s New Zealand films
2010 comedy films
2010 drama films
Films directed by Taika Waititi
Films with screenplays by Taika Waititi
Films set on farms
Films set in New Zealand
Films set in 1984
Films shot in New Zealand
Kickstarter-funded films
Māori-language films
New Zealand coming-of-age comedy-drama films
Treasure hunt films
Vertigo Films films
2010s English-language films